Journal of the American Heart Association: Cardiovascular and Cerebrovascular Disease is a peer-reviewed open access scientific journal and an official journal of the American Heart Association. Since 2015, it is also published with John Wiley & Sons. It was established in 2012 and the editor-in-chief is Bruce Ovbiagele (University of California, San Francisco).

Scope 
The journal publishes all types of original research articles, including studies conducted with human subjects and experimental models, as well as applied clinical, epidemiological, and healthcare policy papers related to cardiovascular and cerebrovascular diseases.

Abstracting and indexing 
The journal is abstracted and indexed in:

According to the Journal Citation Reports, the journal has a 2021 impact factor of 6.107, ranking it 42nd out of 143 journals in the category "Cardiac & Cardiovascular Systems".

References

External links 
 

Wiley (publisher) academic journals
Cardiology journals
Publications established in 2012
English-language journals
American Heart Association academic journals
Journals published between 13 and 25 times per year